The Swiss Chamber Soloists is the concert cycle's chamber ensemble, founded in 1999 and led by the three artistic directors of the Swiss Chamber Concerts Jürg Dähler, Daniel Haefliger  and Felix Renggli.

History 
Swiss Chamber Soloists consist of solo artists, ensembles from Switzerland and guests from abroad and features many world renowned soloists like Sarah Maria Sun, Sarah Wegener, Christophe and Julian Prégardien, Heinz Holliger, Sergio Azzolini, Ilja Gringolts, Patricia Kopatchinskaja, Rosanne Philippens, Thomas Zehetmair, Christophe Coin, Thomas Demenga, Edicson Ruiz, Bruno Canino, Dénes Várjon, Gilles Vonsattel, Hopkinson Smith and The Hilliard Ensemble. From 1999 to 2020 Swiss Chamber Soloists produced 15 CDs for the labels ECM, NEOS, Claves and Genuin. International tours brought the ensemble to Australia and Japan as well as to Austria, France, Germany and Italy with appearances at the Festival Archipel Geneva, the Lucerne Festival, the Menuhin-Festival Gstaad and the Wittener Tage für Kammermusik. The repertoire of the Swiss Chamber Soloists ranges from the Baroque, also played on historical instruments, to the modern, with many of the pieces being written for and dedicated to the ensemble.

Singers

Winds

Percussion 

 Matthias Würsch

Plucked Strings

Piano

Other keyboard Instruments

Strings 
Violin

Viola

Cello and double bass

Ensembles

Discography 

 Robert Schumann, Piano Quartett and Piano Quintett (2000) – David Abbott, Piano; Jürg Dähler, Violin; Urs Walker, Violin; Valérie Dähler-Mulet, Viola; Daniel Haefliger, Cello – Claves / CD 50-2008 – 
 Fantasia Telemania (2001) – Georg Philipp Telemann Fantaisies for Flute Solo & Works for Flute Solo by Bettina Skrzypczak, Xavier Dayer, Mathias Steinauer, Robert Suter, Roland Moser, Heinz Holliger, Jacques Wildberger, Nadir Vassena, Christoph Neidhöfer, Hans Ulrich Lehmann, Bernhard A.Batschelet – Felix Renggli, Flute – MGB / CTS-M 73 – 
 Johannes Sebastian Bach, Goldberg Variations BWV 988 (2007) – arranged for String Trio by Dmitry Sitkovetski – Hanna Weinmeister, Violin; Jürg Dähler, Viola; Thomas Grossenbacher, Cello – Neos Classics / NEOS 30801 – 
 Works for Flute Solo (2008) – Works by Johann Sebastian Bach, Heinz Holliger and Carl Philipp Emanuel Bach  – Felix Renggli, Flute; Anne-Laure Pantillon, Piccolo; Anne Parisot, Flute; Matthias Würsch, Percussion – GENUIN / GEN 88129 – 
 Happy Birthday, Elliott Carter! (2008) – Mosaic for Harp, Flute, Oboe, Clarinet, Violin, Viola, Cello and Double bass (2005), Figment 4 for Viola Solo (2007), Enchanted Preludes for Flute and Cello (1988), Tempo e tempi for Soprano, Oboe, Clarinet, Violin and Cello (1999), HBHH for Oboe Solo (2007), Fragment for String Quartet (1994), Quartet for Oboe and String Trio (1995) – Silvia Nopper, Sopran; Felix Renggli, Flute; Emanuel Abbühl, Oboe; Heinz Holliger, Oboe & French Horn; François Benda, Clarinet; Elmar Schmid, Clarinet; Ursula Holliger, Harp; Esther Hoppe, Violin; Daria Zappa, Violin; Carolin Widmann, Violin; Jürg Dähler, Viola; Christoph Schiller, Viola; Daniel Haefliger, Cello; Edicson Ruiz, Double Bass – Neos Classics / NEOS 10816 – 
 Fables (2011) – Works by Alberto Ginastera, Wilhelm Friedemann Bach, Robert Suter and Albert Moeschinger – Felix Renggli, Flute; Heinz Holliger, Oboe, Composer – GENUIN / GEN 11211 – 
 Heinz Holliger, Induuchlen  (2011) – Toronto-Exercices (2005), Gedichte Von Anna Maria Bacher, Puneigä (2000–2002), Induuchlen (2004), Ma'mounia (2002) – Felix Renggli, Flute, Alto Flute, Bass Flute, Piccolo; Olivier Darbellay, French Horn, Natural Horn; Ursula Holliger, Harp; Matthias Würsch, Marimba, Percussion, Cimbalom; Bahar Dördüncü, Piano; Sylvia Nopper, Sopran; Jürg Dähler, Violin & Viola; Daniel Haefliger, Cello; Anna Maria Bacher, Recitation; Albert Streich, Recitation – ECM / ECM 2201 – 
 Heinz Holliger (2014) – Romancendres for Cello and Piano (2003), Feuerwerklein zum "Quatorze Juillet" for Piano Solo (2012), Chaconne for Cello Solo (1975), Partita for Piano Solo (1999) – Daniel Haefliger, cello; Gilles Vonsattel, piano – GENUIN / GEN 14330 – 
 Wolfgang Amadeus Mozart, Chamber Music Music With Winds (2014) - Flute Quartet No. 1 in D major, K. 285, Oboe Quartet in F major, K. 370 (K. 368b), Quintet in A major for Clarinet and Strings, K. 581 – Felix Renggli, Flute; Heinz Holliger, Oboe; François Benda, Basset Clarinet; Esther Hoppe, Violin; Daria Zappa, Violin; Jürg Dähler, Viola; Daniel Haefliger, Cello – GENUIN / GEN 14319 – 
 Flute Concertos (2015), Concertos by Carl Philipp Emanuel Bach & François Devienne – Felix Renggli, Flute; Brian Dean, Concertmaster; Chamber Academy Basel – GENUIN / GEN 15338 – 
 Heinz Holliger, Machaut-Transkriptionen (2015) – Works by Guillaume de Machaut and Heinz Holliger for four Voices and three Violas – Gordon Jones, Baritone; David James, Countertenor; Rogers Covey-Crump, Tenor; Steven Harrold, Tenor; Geneviève Strosser, Viola; Jürg Dähler, Viola; Muriel Cantoreggi, Viola – ECM / ECM 2224 – 
 Fairy Tales Without Words  (2017) – Robert Schumann: Märchenbilder, op. 113 for viola and piano (1851), Märchenerzählungen, op. 132 for clarinet, viola and piano (1853) / Hans Ulrich Lehmann: "Without words", seven songs for viola and piano (2011) / György Kurtág: Hommage à R. Sch., op. 15d for clarinet (also bass drum), viola and piano (1990) – Jürg Dähler, Viola; François Benda, Clarinet; Gilles Vonsattel, Piano – GENUIN / GEN 17485 – 
 Dmitri Schostakovich (2017) – Piano Trio No. 1 in c-Moll op. 8 (1923), Piano Trio No. 2 in e-Moll op. 67 (1944), Violin Sonata op. 134 (1968) – Ilya Gringolts, Violin; Daniel Haefliger, Cello; Gilles Vonstatten, Piano – Claves / 50-1817 – 
 Friedrich Cerha (2018) – 8 Sätze Nach Hölderin-Fragmenten for String Sextet (1995), Quintet for Oboe and String Quartet (2007), 9 Bagatellen for String Trio (2008) – Heinz Holliger, Oboe; Corinne Chapelle, Violin; Meesung Hong Coleman, Violin; Esther Hoppe, Violin; Hanna Weinmeister, Violin; Daria Zappa, Violin; Hannes Bärtschi, Viola; Jürg Dähler, Viola; Daniel Haefliger, Cello – Claves / 50-1816 – 
 Xavier Dayer  (2020) – Solus cum Solo for Solo Cello (2009), Come heavy sleep for Flute, Viola and Cello (2016), De Umbri (II) for Flute and String Trio (2018), Mémoire, cercles for Oboe and String Trio (2011), Nocturne for Oboe, Flute and String Trio (2014) – Heinz Holliger, Oboe; Felix Renggli, Flute; Irene Abrigo, Violin; Daria Zappa, Violin; Jürg Dähler, Viola; Daniel Haefliger, Cello – Claves / CD 3007

References

External links 

 Swiss Chamber Concerts Official Website
 Radio Swiss Classic Musikdatenbank
NZZ: "Kammermusik vom Feinsten"
 « Swiss Chamber Concerts: créations à foison » by Xavier Dayer sur xavierdayer.com

Swiss classical musicians
Chamber orchestras